Stephanus is a genus of parasitoid wasps in the family Stephanidae.  Records of species are from Europe and Asia.

Species
The following list may be incomplete:
 Stephanus anijimensis Watanabe & van Achterberg, 2014
 Stephanus antinorii Gribodo, 1879
 Schlettererius bidentatus van Achterberg & Yang, 2004
 Stephanus coronatus Jurine (in Panzer), 1801 (= Ichneumon serrator Fabricius, 1798)
 Stephanus serrator Fabricius, 1798 
 Stephanus tridentatus van Achterberg & Yang, 2004

References

External links
 
 

Stephanoidea
Hymenoptera genera